Carthara albicosta is a species of snout moth in the genus Carthara. It was described by Francis Walker in 1865. It is found from the Amazon basin to Costa Rica.

References

Moths described in 1865
Epipaschiinae